Borden Oaks is a plantation house and historic district near Greensboro, Alabama, United States.  It was added to the National Register of Historic Places on July 7, 1994, as a part of the Plantation Houses of the Alabama Canebrake and Their Associated Outbuildings Multiple Property Submission.

History
The main house at Borden Oaks was built in 1835 by John Scott Gray and his wife, Martha Thompson Cocke Gray, on property given to them by Martha's father.  The estate was initially named Locust Lawn.  John Scott Gray died on October 19, 1835, leaving Martha a widow.  She would remain single for ten years.  Their child, John Ruffin Gray, would die in 1862 in the Battle of Fredericksburg.  Martha remarried on November 3, 1845, to Richard Benjamin Borden, a widower originally from Carteret County, North Carolina. Locust Lawn came to be known as Borden Oaks after their marriage.

Architecture
The house is a two-story frame Federal style structure with a hipped roof.  The front elevation is a five bay facade with a central two-tiered porch over the central bay and doorways.  The upper and lower central doorways on the front facade have sidelights and transoms derived from a design published in Asher Benjamin's The Practice of Architecture (1833).  A two-story ell, with matching overall proportions, is attached to the rear of the house.  The original porch was removed from the house after 1924 and the columns were reused on a house in nearby Greensboro, however several feet of the lower portion of each column was cut off to fit the new house. These were returned to a descendant and then owner of the property, Mary Esther Borden Coleman, when that later house was demolished in the late 20th century. They were returned to Borden Oaks and the porch rebuilt when the house was stabilized and exterior restored by Bestor Wynne Coleman, Mrs. Coleman's son.  However, new paneled bases for the columns had to be fabricated to rebuild the portico in keeping with its original proportions.

References

External links
Borden Oaks after restoration, taken in 2007
Rear elevation of Borden Oaks after restoration

National Register of Historic Places in Hale County, Alabama
Historic districts in Hale County, Alabama
Houses on the National Register of Historic Places in Alabama
Houses completed in 1835
Plantation houses in Alabama
Houses in Hale County, Alabama
Historic districts on the National Register of Historic Places in Alabama